Mynewsdesk is an all-in-one brand newsroom and multimedia public relations (PR) platform, where companies can set up newsrooms to publish and distribute their content, simultaneously publishing it on social media or embed the newsroom to their own site.

Mynewsdesk was founded in 2003 and is based in Stockholm, Sweden, but the company also has sales offices in Malmö, Gothenburg, Oslo, Copenhagen, and Leipzig.

Metropolitan Police security incident 
In July 2019 a series of bizarre tweets appeared on the Twitter account of Scotland Yard, the headquarters of the Metropolitan Police Service in London. The account has 1.2 million followers. These messages were also repeated in press releases emailed out to journalists from the police force's official email address. On Saturday 20 July the police force indicated that the incident was caused by "unauthorised access" to its MyNewsDesk account which publishes content via the Met's website, Twitter account and email.

References

External links 
 
 Mynewsdesk.com

Swedish news websites
Companies based in Stockholm
Mass media companies established in 2003
2003 establishments in Sweden